Teremitra efatensis is a species of sea snail, a marine gastropod mollusk in the family Pyramimitridae, the mitre snails.

Description
The length of the shell attains 11 mm.

Distribution
This marine species occurs off Vanuatu

References

 Aubry U. (1999) Nuove terebre e antichi versi. Ancona: L'Informatore Piceno. 47 pp.
 Kantor Y., Lozouet P., Puillandre N. & Bouchet P. (2014) Lost and found: The Eocene family Pyramimitridae (Neogastropoda) discovered in the Recent fauna of the Indo-Pacific. Zootaxa 3754(3): 239–276

External links
 MNHN, Paris: holotype

Pyramimitridae
Gastropods described in 1999